Endromopoda is a genus of ichneumon wasps in the family Ichneumonidae. There are about 12 described species in Endromopoda.

Species
These 12 species belong to the genus Endromopoda:

 Endromopoda annulitarsis (Ashmead, 1906) c g
 Endromopoda appendiculata Constantineanu & Pisica, 1977 c g
 Endromopoda arundinator (Fabricius, 1804) c g
 Endromopoda detrita (Holmgren, 1860) c g
 Endromopoda lithocolletidis (Ashmead, 1890) c g
 Endromopoda nigricoxis (Ulbricht, 1910) c g
 Endromopoda nitida (Brauns, 1898) c g
 Endromopoda perparvula (Kusigemati, 1985) c g
 Endromopoda phragmitidis (Perkins, 1957) c g
 Endromopoda phragmitis (Perkins, 1957) g
 Endromopoda producta (Walley, 1960) c g b
 Endromopoda rubescens (Walley, 1960) c g

Data sources: i = ITIS, c = Catalogue of Life, g = GBIF, b = Bugguide.net

References

Further reading

External links

 

Pimplinae